L'Encyclopédie du savoir relatif et absolu or Livre secret des fourmis. 
English: The Encyclopedia of Absolute and Relative Knowledge

Also known as L'ESRA by readers, this book by Bernard Werber is actually a dictionary of things ranging from bread recipes to the explanation of the number "Zero".

The book is a copy of the (fictional) testament of Edmond Wells, uncle of the main character from the book Les Fourmis.

The book is titled L'Encyclopédie du savoir relatif et absolu and is revealed article after article in the Ant Trilogy (Les Fourmis,  Le Jour des fourmis and La Révolution des fourmis) as well as in the Nous les dieux trilogy.

It is a collection of little-known facts, as seen from a physical, philosophical, metaphysical and many other fields. It contains a certain number of errors and Urban myths.

The book was published in 1993 and was illustrated by Guillaume Aretos. It has since been republished many times, notably under the names Livre secret des fourmis in 2003, and Nouvelle Encyclopédie du savoir relatif et absolu in 2009.

External links 
  L'Encyclopédie du savoir relatif et absolu online An Encyclopedia created by fans based on the book, maintained by Bernard Werber.

1993 French novels
Novels by Bernard Werber
Science fiction books
French science fiction novels